Snakes is an update to the classic Snake game from Nokia. It could be downloaded from the official website of the game for free.

Features
 Viral distribution would allow the game to copy itself to another N-Gage using Bluetooth as the carrier.
 Single player game has 42 levels (37 on N-Series), with both square and hex grids available in the playfield. Higher levels allow the player to climb around the edges and play on both surfaces of the playfield.
 Up to four players can play in a multiplayer game using 4 N-Gage devices and bluetooth as the carrier.
 Nokia maintained a worldwide leaderboard of scores, once accessible through the N-Gage Arena service. Any N-Gage with a valid data plan could upload the high score from within the game.N-Gage Arena was closed in 2010.

Compatibility
Although Snakes was primarily designed for the Nokia N-Gage platform, it was also once available for Nokia N95. Several other devices supported the optimized file mention earlier as well, one example was Nokia E65 which could support and run the game at a near-full framerate as on Nokia N95. However, there had been cases in which a phone which could support the game, which crashed promptly after launching the application.

Reception

The game received "favorable" reviews according to the review aggregation website Metacritic.

Sequel
A sequel titled Snakes Subsonic was released on May 22, 2008 for the second generation N-Gage platform. It was developed by Barking Lizards.

References

External links
Snakes Official Website (Webarchive, Flash needed)

Snakes Subsonic at N-Gage.com
Review of Snakes for N-Gage on All About N-Gage
Review of Snakes for S60 smartphones on All About N-Gage

2005 video games
N-Gage games
Snake video games
Symbian games
Video games about reptiles
Video games developed in the United Kingdom
Nokia games
Multiplayer and single-player video games